This is a list of drivers who have competed in the NASCAR Pinty's Series. This list is accurate up to the end of the 2010 season.

Pinty's Series drivers
Pinty's Series drivers
NASCAR Pinty's Series drivers
NASCAR Pinty's Series drivers
P